Michael Washington (born October 19, 1986) is an American football wide receiver who is a free agent. He played college football at the University of Hawaii at Manoa. He was signed by the Pittsburgh Power as an undrafted free agent in 2011.

Early life
Washington attended Aliquippa Senior High School in Aliquippa, Pennsylvania, where he was a member of the football team as well as the track and field team.

College career
Washington committed to Hawaii on January 26, 2005. Washington played sparingly for his first 3 seasons with the Warriors. Washington saw a much larger role as a senior in 2008, catching 62 passes for 789 yards and six receiving touchdowns. Washington was named Second Team All-Western Athletic Conference.

Statistics

Professional career

Pittsburgh Power
On October 21, 2010, Washington was assigned to the Pittsburgh Power. Washington played a large role for the expansion Power. Washington returned to the Power in 2013 on a new three-year contract.

Spokane Shock
In October 2013, Washington was traded to the Spokane Shock for Arvell Nelson and Ben Ossai.

Arizona Rattlers
On March 2, 2016, Washington was assigned to the Arizona Rattlers.

Tampa Bay Storm
On April 21, 2016, Washington was traded to the Tampa Bay Storm for future considerations. On June 7, 2016, Washington was placed on reassignment. On June 9, 2016, Washington was assigned to the Storm. On June 21, 2016, Washington was placed on reassignment.

Shanghai Skywalkers
Washington was drafted by the Shanghai Skywalkers in the eighth round of the 2016 CAFL Draft. He earned Judge Spirit Award and All-Pro South Division All-Star honors after catching 47 passes for 586 yards and 15 touchdowns. He is listed on the Skywalkers' roster for the 2018 season.

Washington Valor
Washington was assigned to the Washington Valor for the 2017 season. He was placed on inactive reserve on May 16 and then placed on injured reserve on May 30, 2017.

AFL statistics

Stats from ArenaFan:

References

External links
Hawaii Rainbow Warriors bio
Arena Football League bio

1986 births
Living people
American football wide receivers
Hawaii Rainbow Warriors football players
Pittsburgh Power players
Spokane Shock players
Arizona Rattlers players
Players of American football from Pittsburgh
Tampa Bay Storm players
Shanghai Skywalkers players
Washington Valor players